Guru Brahma Nand Ji Govt. Polytechnic Institute Nilokheri is a co-educational institution of higher learning located in the town of Nilokheri in the Karnal region of Haryana. The institute was established in 1947, by Govt. of India. It was re-established in 1951 is affiliated with the Haryana State Board of Technical Education (HSBTE), Panchkula and approved by All India Council of Technical Education, New Delhi (AICTE) and the Department of Technical Education, Govt. of Haryana (DTE). It is one of the best in North India. Diploma holders from this institute serve in various government organizations and institutions all over India.

History 
The Guru BrahmaNand Ji Govt. Polytechnic Institute Nilokheri is one of the premier Technical Institutions in the country with an international repute. The institute is situated at a distance of 143 km. from Delhi on National Highway-I towards north. This Institute was originally located at Rasool (West Punjab) as Govt. school of Engg.  After partition, it was shifted to Chhachhrauli (District. Yamunanagar) and subsequently to Nilokheri in 1951. Nilokheri Polytechnic, Nilokheri established by the Govt. of India in 1947, was already in existence. Both these institutes kept running simultaneously till 1958 when these were merged on recommendation of Govt. of India and named as Punjab Polytechnic, Nilokheri with the reorganizing of the State on 1 November 1966, this institute was renamed as Haryana Polytechnic, Nilokheri, it was again renamed as Govt. Polytechnic Nilokheri, and recently it is renamed as Guru BrahmaNand Ji Govt. Polytechnic Institute Nilokheri. It was a part of the scheme called "Mazdoor Manzil" aimed at self-sufficiency for the rural-cum-urban township in all the essential requirements of life.

Recognition 
Guru Brahamanand Ji Govt. Polytechnic Institute Nilokheri is affiliated with the Haryana State Board of Technical Education (HSBTE), Panchkula and approved by All India Council of Technical Education, New Delhi (AICTE) and the Department of Technical Education, Govt. of Haryana (DTE).

Academic programs 
Guru Brahamanand Ji Govt. Polytechnic Institute Nilokheri offers post Tenth Class diplomas in the following three-year engineering programs:

Skill development programs 
Institution also imparts training to artisans and unskilled personnel run under 100% Centre Sponsored Community Development through Polytechnic (CDTP) Scheme and courses Creation of Employment Generation Opportunities (CEGO). These courses help in up gradation of skill and generation of employment.

Consultancy
The institute is conducting testing of cement, concrete and soils for Govt. Deptts., Semi-Govt. Deptts., Public Sector Agencies and Private Sector Agencies. Department has the expertise to handle various Civil Works.

Alumni
The diploma holders from this institute have found employment in various Govt. Deptts, Public and Pvt. Enterprises such as; Railways, MES, IITs, CPWD, PWD (B & R), PWD Irrigation, PWD (Public Health), Pollution Control Board, Housing Boards, HUDA, HSEB, MITC, Panchayat Raj, and some has started their own enterprises. Students of this institute have also been able enter other countries as well i.e. Eritrea, Dubai etc.

To celebrate alumnus of the institute alumni meet are organised as like in the year 2008 and 2018.

National Cadet Corps
This institute also has National Cadet Corps scheme. NCC ( Army Wing) is operational in the Institute since 1960, having a strength of full COY of 160 NCC cadets under 7 HR.BN. NCC Karnal for better development of students enriching their overall personality. The cadets actively participate in social activities such as Save Earth Campaign during Earth Day, Swachhta Abhiyan on Gandhi Jayanti, Beti Bachao- Beti Padhao Abhiyan on International Day of the Girl Child & International Literacy Day etc.

Hostels for accommodation
There are two hostels for the accommodation of diploma students. 
Boys Hostel-A
Girls Hostel-B

History
The concept of the diploma institute at Nilokheri as an engineering college was first introduced in year 2000. The college building was previously used by the students of Govt. Polytechnic Nilokheri was granted the status of Engineering college in 2016. The college was inaugurated by Manohar Lal Khattar, who was the Chief Minister of Haryana. It was established to facilitate and promote studies and research in emerging areas of Engineering education with focus on new frontiers of technology and connected fields. The Guru BrahmaNand Ji Govt. Polytechnic Nilokheri (GBNGPN) formerly known as the Govt. Polytechnic Nilokheri (GPN)'s classes of  Diploma Ist year were shifted out en-block to mark the beginning of GEC Nilokheri at its campus in new building. The Guru BrahmaNand Ji Govt. Polytechnic Nilokheri  (GBNGPN) is thus the mother institution of GEC Nilokheri.

See also
 Government Engineering College, Nilokheri
 List of universities in India
 Universities and colleges in India
 Education in India
 List of institutions of higher education in Haryana

References

 HSBTE RESULT

All India Council for Technical Education
Engineering colleges in Haryana
Technical schools
Karnal
Nilokheri